5,6-MeO-MiPT, or 5,6-dimethoxy-N-methyl-N-isopropyltryptamine, is a lesser-known psychedelic drug.  It is the 5,6-dimethoxy analog of MiPT. 5,6-MeO-MiPT was first synthesized by Alexander Shulgin. In his book TiHKAL (Tryptamines I Have Known and Loved), 5,6-MeO-MiPT produces no noticeable psychoactive effects.  Very little data exists about the pharmacological properties, metabolism, and toxicity of 5,6-MeO-MiPT.

See also 

 Tryptamine
 MiPT
 Psychedelics, dissociatives and deliriants

External links 
 5,6-MeO-MiPT Entry in TIHKAL
 5,6-MeO-MIPT Entry in TiHKAL • info

Categorization

Psychedelic tryptamines